Dahavi Fa (Marathi: दहावी फ; translation: Tenth 'F') is a Marathi drama film released on 17 February 2002. Produced by Sunil Sukthankar and directed by Sumitra Bhave and Sunil Sukthankar, the film stars Atul Kulkarni, Jyoti Subhash, Milind Gunaji, Nimish Kathale and Vrushasen Dabholkar. The film's music is composed by Shrirang Umrani.

The film is based on a story of how teachers discriminate against the students failing the exams. Atul Kulkarni, who plays the teacher in the film, however teaches students to channelize their anger in a positive way. The film did well at the box office and was screened for 35 weeks in Pune.

Plot
Kids from class 10 'F' realized that they are the victims of brutal discrimination. They were not willing to accept tags like goons or thugs. Frustrated with the situation, these kids decide to take matters in their own hands and ended up vandalizing school properties. As a result, they get suspended from school.

Finally a courageous teacher steps up and confronts the biased approach of the school based on the education system and rallies these kids to channel anger in a positive way.

Cast
 Atul Kulkarni
 Jyoti Subhash
 Milind Gunaji
 Nimish Kathale
 Vrishasen Dabholkar
 Makarand Purohit

Soundtrack
The music has been directed by Shrirang Umrani.

Awards
 Maharashtra State Film Awards
 2003 - Best Feature Film
 2003 - Best Story Award to Sumitra Bhave
 2003 - Best Lyrics to Sumitra Bhave for the song "Khushi Cheheryavar Mazhya"
 2003 - Best Music Director to Shriram Umrani

References

External links 
 

2000s Marathi-language films
Films directed by Sumitra Bhave–Sunil Sukthankar